Dhoni is situated around 15 Kilometers from Palakkad town in Kerala, India. Dhoni is named after a boat shaped rock on one of its hill, as boat in Malayalam is called "thoni". It is famous for Dhoni Waterfalls and the Western Ghat forests.

Overview
Dhoni is bordered by Western Ghats on north. It is also a popular trekking spot for tourists. Dhoni farm is situated at Dhoni.

Dhoni Waterfalls is located around 15 km from Palakkad and around 34 km from Kollengode Town in Palakkad. An entry pass is required before entering the area. A fee of Rs.100/- (from 15 August 2016) will be charged per person. You have to walk 4 km from the bottom of the hill to reach the waterfalls. The roads are not tarred, and one can see water flowing down between the rocks on the way up. No restrictions for carrying food to the top.

Upon reaching the top, one can see the lovely view of the waterfalls and enjoy a bath in the cold waters. With a climb up the rocks one can feel the beauty of the jungles and it is said to have leopards, elephants and so. However, encountering them is rare. A 4 km walk can sometimes be dehydrating as it is a humid area and never climb the hill without much rest in between as continuous climbing can make you feel tired and will kill the joy of trekking.

Important Landmarks
 St.James the Great Church
 Shiva Temple , Dhoni 
 Plaza Junction, Dhoni
 Chettil Vettiya Bhagavathy Temple
 Akshaj Dharani Farm
 LEAD College of Management, Dhoni, Palakkad
 Hemambika Railway Colony
 Railway Headquarters
 Krishna Temple, Pappadi
 Dhoni Livestock Farm
 Sidhi Vinayaka Temple
 Pakal Veedu Asylum
 Government Highschool, Ummini

Suburbs and Villages
 Ullas Nagar and Vishnu Nagar
 Soorya Nagar and Shanthi Nagar
 Akathethara and EMS Nagar
 Thanav Railway Station and Athaniparamba

Gallery

References

External links

Villages in Palakkad district